Zeltnera venusta is a species of flowering plant in the gentian family known by the common names California centaury, charming centaury and canchalagua. This centaury is native to much of  California, southern Oregon, and northwest Baja California.

It grows in many habitats up to elevations around 1300 meters. It is an annual wildflower rarely reaching half a meter in height. The pointed oval leaves grow opposite on the thin stems. The inflorescence is tipped with one or more showy star-shaped flowers, each with a white-centered magenta corolla about 2 centimeters wide.

Until 2004, it was placed in genus Centaurium as Centaurium venustum.

References

External links
 Jepson Manual Treatment
 USDA Plants Profile
 Photo gallery

venusta
Flora of California
Flora of Oregon
Flora of the California desert regions
Flora of the Klamath Mountains
Flora of the Sierra Nevada (United States)
Flora of the Cascade Range
Natural history of the California chaparral and woodlands
Natural history of the California Coast Ranges
Natural history of the Central Valley (California)
Natural history of the Channel Islands of California
Natural history of the Mojave Desert
Natural history of the Peninsular Ranges
Natural history of the Santa Monica Mountains
Natural history of the Transverse Ranges
Taxa named by Asa Gray